Given a Hilbert space with a tensor product structure a product numerical range is defined as a numerical range with respect to the subset of product vectors. In some situations, especially in the context of quantum mechanics product numerical range is known as local numerical range

Introduction 

Let  be an operator acting on an -dimensional Hilbert space .

An analogous notion can be defined for operators acting on a composite Hilbert space with a tensor product structure. Consider first a bi–partite Hilbert space,  of a composite dimension .

Let  be an operator acting on the composite Hilbert space.

Product numerical radius 

Let  be a tensor product Hilbert space.

Notation 

The notion of numerical range of a given operator, also called "field of values", has been extensively studied during the last few decades and its usefulness in quantum theory has been emphasized. Several generalizations of numerical range are known. In particular, Marcus introduced the notion of ’’’decomposable numerical range’’’, the properties of which are a subject of considerable interest.

The product numerical range can be considered as a particular case of the decomposable numerical range defined for operators acting on a tensor product Hilbert space. This notion may also be considered as a numerical range relative to the proper subgroup  of the full unitary group .

General case 

It is not difficult to establish the basic properties of the product numerical range which are independent of the partition of the Hilbert space and of the structure of the operator. We list them below leaving some simple items without a proof.

Basic properties 

Topological facts concerning product numerical range for general operators.

 Product numerical range forms a connected set in the complex plane. This is true because product numerical range is a continuous image of a connected set.
 Product numerical range is subadditive. For all  
 For all  and  
 For all  and  
 Let  and 
 If one of them is normal then the numerical range of their tensor product coincides with the convex hull of the product numerical range, 
 For all , we have  and

Convexity 
The product numerical range does not need to be convex. Consider the following simple example. Let 

Matrix  defined above is matrix with eigenvalues . Actually, by direct computation we have 

Product numerical range of matrix  is presented below.

Product numerical range forms a nonempty set for a general operator. In particular it contains the barycenter of the spectrum.

Barycenter
Product numerical range of  includes the barycenter of the spectrum, 

Product numerical radius is a vector norm on matrices, but it is not a matrix norm. Product numerical radius is invariant with respect to local unitaries, which have the tensor product structure.

References
 Z. Puchała, P. Gawron, J.A. Miszczak, Ł. Skowronek, M.-. Choi, K. Życzkowski, "Product numerical range in a space with tensor product structure", Linear Algebra Appl., 434 (2011) 327–342.  .
 P. Gawron, Z. Puchała, J. A. Miszczak, Ł. Skowronek, K. Życzkowski, "Restricted numerical range: a versatile tool in the theory of quantum information", J. Math. Phys. 51, 102204 (2010).  .

Quantum mechanics
Operator theory